Adaheli was the personification of the sun in the Carib mythology of the Orinoco region of South America. 

In the story, Adaheli was troubled by the fact that there were no people on Earth, and so he descended to earth to create them. Shortly thereafter, people first appeared, born from the caiman. All of the original women were quite beautiful. However, some of the men were so ugly that the others found them to be literally intolerable. This led to the separation of the original people, with the ugly men going to the east with their wives and the others going to the west with their wives.

References

South American deities
Solar gods